The 2010 MTN 8 was the 36th edition of this annual knock out tournament. The tournament was won by Orlando Pirates, who beat Moroka Swallows on penalties in the final. The trophy was Orlando Pirates' first major cup win in ten years. It was contested by the eight top teams from the Premier Soccer League table at the end of the 2009–10 season. The tournament began on 20 August 2009, and ended on 2 October 2010. The quarter finals were played as single matches, while the semi finals are played over two legs. The final was played at the neutral Moses Mabhida Stadium.

Teams
The eight teams qualified for the MTN 8 Wafa Wafa knockout competition are:

 1. Supersport United
 2. Mamelodi Sundowns
 3. Kaizer Chiefs
 4. Santos
 5. Orlando Pirates
 6. Bloemfontein Celtic
 7. Ajax Cape Town
 8. Moroka Swallows

Brackets

Fixtures and results
The first round matches were played on 20th, 21st and 22 August 2010. The draw for the semi finals took place on 23 August 2010.  The first legs of the semi finals will be played on 11 and 12 September.  The return legs will be played on 25 and 26 September 2010.

Quarter-finals

Teams through to the Semi-finals

 Ajax Cape Town
 Moroka Swallows
 Kaizer Chiefs
 Orlando Pirates

Semi-finals

|}

1st Leg

2nd Leg

Final

References

External links
Premier Soccer League
South African Football Association

MTN 8
MTN
2010 domestic association football cups